Zhengjia is a town in Dongchangfu District, Liaocheng, in western Shandong province, China.

References

Township-level divisions of Shandong